John McInnes or MacInnes may refer to:

John McInnes (Australian footballer) (1884–1950), Australian footballer
John McInnes (footballer, born 1923), Scottish footballer
John McInnes (footballer, born 1927) (1927–1973), Scottish footballer
John McInnes (politician) (1878–1950), South Australian politician from 1927 to 1950
John McInnes (ski jumper) (born 1939), Canadian ski jumper at the 1964 and 1968 Winter Olympics
John MacInnes (Gaelic scholar) (1930–2019), Scottish Gaelic scholar
John MacInnes (writer) (born 1969), writer for the game Call of Duty: Advanced Warfare in 2014
John MacInnes (ice hockey) (1925–1983), Canadian ice hockey player and coach

See also
John McInnis (disambiguation)